Raymond Booth (born 5 September 1949) is a Welsh former professional footballer who played as a winger. He made appearances in the English Football League with his hometown club of Wrexham

References

1949 births
Living people
Welsh footballers
Association football wingers
Wrexham A.F.C. players
Rhyl F.C. players
English Football League players
Footballers from Wrexham